Sakoïba is a village and rural commune in the Cercle of Ségou in the Ségou Region of southern-central Mali. The commune contains 23 villages in an area of approximately 360 square kilometers. In the 2009 census it had a population of 18,282. The village of Sakoïba, the chef-lieu of the commune is 16 km south of Ségou.

References

External links
.

Communes of Ségou Region